Daidogawa Dam is a gravity dam located in Shiga prefecture in Japan. The dam is used for flood control. The catchment area of the dam is 152 km2. The dam impounds about 120  ha of land when full and can store 22100 thousand cubic meters of water. The construction of the dam was done in 1978.

References

Dams in Shiga Prefecture
1978 establishments in Japan